Bormana was a Celtic goddess, the female equivalent of the god Borvo (Bormanus). Bormana was worshipped alongside Bormanus as his consort. The pair of them were, for example, worshipped at Die (Drôme) in the south of France. The goddess also occurred independently at Saint-Vulbas (Ain). Bormana was considered a goddess of water and healing.

References 
 Dictionary of Celtic Myth and Legend. Miranda Green. Thames and Hudson Ltd. London. 1997

Gaulish goddesses
Water goddesses
Health goddesses